Petronius (–66) was a Roman courtier during the reign of Nero, and author of the Satyricon.

Petronius may also refer to:

People 
 Members of the Petronia gens, an ancient Roman plebeian family
 Peter I of Trani, first Norman count of Trani

Other uses 
 Petronius (horse), a racehorse
 Petronius (oil platform), in the Gulf of Mexico
 Petronius Paperonius, Donald Duck's ancestor, in comics
 Petronius the Arbiter, a cat in Robert A. Heinlein's The Door into Summer